Prill School, also known as the Prill School Museum, is a historic one-room school building located in Henry Township near Akron, Fulton County, Indiana.  It was built in 1876, and is a one-story, rectangular, red brick building topped by a slate gable roof. The Prill School closed in 1925. The school was restored in 1971 by a group of local citizens and opened to visitors as a museum.

It was listed on the National Register of Historic Places in 1981.

References

External links

History museums in Indiana
Education museums in the United States
One-room schoolhouses in Indiana
School buildings on the National Register of Historic Places in Indiana
School buildings completed in 1876
Buildings and structures in Fulton County, Indiana
National Register of Historic Places in Fulton County, Indiana
Museums in Fulton County, Indiana
1876 establishments in Indiana